Konstantin Agapov (born 18 October 1986) is a Russian football coach and a former futsal player. He is a conditioning coach with FC Ural Yekaterinburg.

Playin career
Apagov spent most past of his career in VIZ-Sinara, famous Russian futsal club from Yekaterinburg. In 2007 Agapov helped VIZ to win Russian Futsal Cup for the first time. One year later he scored one of the shootout penalties in the final of the 2007–08 UEFA Futsal Cup.

Agapov made his debut in Russian national team in 2007 in friendly match against Iran. Next year he was a member of the Russian team participating in the Futsal world championship, where the Russian side achieved semifinal.

In 2015 Agapov moved to Dina Moscow, the most titled club of Russian futsal. On March 7 he scored his first goal for Dina in the match against Politech.

Achievements 
UEFA Cup winner: 2007/08
Russian Superleague champion: 2008/09, 2009/10
Russian Cup winner: 2007
World championship semifinal: 2008

External links
MFK Dina Moskva profile
AMFR profile

1986 births
Living people
MFK Dina Moskva players
Russian men's futsal players